The Sumba–Hawu languages are a group of closely related Austronesian languages, spoken in East Nusa Tenggara, Indonesia.

The most widely spoken Sumba–Hawu language is Kambera, with a quarter million speakers on the eastern half of Sumba Island.

The Hawu language of Savu Island is suspected of having a non-Austronesian substratum, but perhaps not to a greater extent that other languages of central and eastern Flores, such as Sika, or indeed of Central Malayo-Polynesian in general.

Classification
The Sumba–Hawu languages are all closely related. Blust (2008) found convincing evidence for linking Kambera (representing the Sumba languages) with Hawu.

Hawu–Dhao
Hawu
Dhao
Sumba languages
Central–East Sumbanese
East Sumbanese: Kambera (dialect cluster)
Mamboru
Central Sumbanese: Anakalangu, Wanukaka, Ponduk, Baliledu
Wejewa–Lamboya
Kodi–Gaura

References

External links
 Sumba–Hawu at Ethnologue (22nd ed., 2019).

 
Languages of Indonesia